Lisandro Magallán (born 27 September 1993) is an Argentine professional footballer who plays as a centre-back for Spanish club Elche.

He also played for the Argentina football team at the 2016 Summer Olympics.

Club career

La Plata and Boca Juniors
Born in La Plata, Magallán made his senior debut for Gimnasia La Plata on 10 August 2010. In April 2012, he was reported to have been scouted by English club Manchester City. On 26 July 2012 Boca Juniors paid $1.4 million for 80% of the rights to Magallán's services. In October 2014, Magallán scored his first goal for Boca Juniors against River Plate in the Superclásico.

Ajax
He signed for Dutch club Ajax on 2 January 2019. He moved on loan to Spanish club Deportivo Alavés on 2 September 2019. Magallán scored his first goal for Alavés in a 2–0 win over Celta Vigo on 20 October 2019.

In September 2020 he moved on loan to Italian club Crotone. In August 2021 he moved on loan to Belgian club Anderlecht.

Elche
Magallán signed for Elche in January 2023.

International career
He has played for Argentina at under-20 and under-23 level.

References

1993 births
Living people
Argentine footballers
Club de Gimnasia y Esgrima La Plata footballers
Boca Juniors footballers
Rosario Central footballers
Defensa y Justicia footballers
Argentine Primera División players
Primera Nacional players
Footballers at the 2016 Summer Olympics
Olympic footballers of Argentina
Footballers from La Plata
Association football central defenders
AFC Ajax players
Elche CF players
Argentine expatriate footballers
Argentine expatriate sportspeople in the Netherlands
Expatriate footballers in the Netherlands
Argentina under-20 international footballers
Eredivisie players
La Liga players
Deportivo Alavés players
Argentine expatriate sportspeople in Spain
Expatriate footballers in Spain
Serie A players
F.C. Crotone players
Expatriate footballers in Italy
R.S.C. Anderlecht players
Belgian Pro League players
Argentine expatriates in Belgium
Expatriate footballers in Belgium
Argentine expatriate sportspeople in Italy
Argentine expatriate sportspeople in Belgium